Shri Shantadurga (Kalangutkarin) Devasthan Nanora is a Hindu temple in Nanoda village, Bicholim taluka in Goa. The goddess Shantadurga is worshiped in the form of Vishweshwari.

History 

The original temple was located in Calangute near Mapusa City Taluka Bardez. In the 17th century, due to forceful conversion of Hindus by Portuguese invaders, the temple was shifted to Nanora in Bicholim Taluka, where most such temples shifted. Nanora is situated between city Assonora and Mulgaon in South. Mulgaon is famous for temples which were moved from Salcette (Shri Dev ShantaDurga Rawalnath Panchaytan Devasthan & Shri Shatadurga Ravalnath Maydekar Devashtan) and Kansarpal in North which is famous for Mahamaya Kalika Devasthan Kasarpal, where as west of Nanora is Advalpal, which is famous for Kuldevta of Goud Saraswat Brahmins Sharvani Devastan and east of Nanora is the village of Ladfe and the city of Bicholim.

It was repaired in the 1990s when the temple was made into a marble masterpiece.

The main priest is from the Bhuskute family (Kokanstha Brahmins).  The temple has a Dipa Stambha and agrashalas (guest houses).

Deity 

The temple is dedicated to Shantadurga, the goddess who mediated between the gods Vishnu and Shiva. The deity is also called 'Santeri' colloquially. Local legends tell of a battle between Shiva and Vishnu. The battle was so fierce that the god Brahma prayed to Parvati to intervene, which she did in the form of Shantadurga. Shantadurga placed Vishnu on her right hand and Shiva on her left hand and settled the fight.

The deity of Shantadurga is shown as holding two serpents, one in each hand, representing Vishnu and Shiva. She is then said have gone to Kalangut, a village in Bardez Taluka. The main idol in the sanctum sanctorum is more than 800 years old and is in the form of lingam.

Devotees 

The deity is believed to be patron deity of 96 Kulee Maratha, Kalavants, Bhandari, and Rajapur Saraswat Brahmins community spread all over India. Familiar surnames of the devotees are Sawant, Gad Desai, Naik, Kalangutkar, Kangutkar, Kalgutkar, Karangutkar, Kandolkar, Desai, Gawas, Vernekar, etc. The Sawant family are spread in Assagao, Oxelbag,Guirim and Mapusa; while Gad Desai are spread in Camurlim, Assagao, Keri, Morjim. The Desai are settled in a small village called Pirna of Desai Wada, Pirna Bardez, Goa.

Festivals 

 The main festival of the temple is called as Shishirotsav (popularly known as Shigmo). It is a 10-day celebration and includes procession of deities in different Vahanas with other rituals like kalotsav, Homa, Dhwajarohana, Gulalotsava, Rathotsava, etc.
 Navaratri
 Vasant Panchami
 Akshay Tritiya
 Shravani somvar The First Shravani Somvar is Celebrated by Desai of Desai wada, Pirna, Bardez, Goa.
 Dasara

See also
Temples of Goa
Shri Gaudapadacharya Math
Kavale
Mangeshi Village
Mangueshi Temple
Shanta Durga Temple
Kansarpal
Mahamaya Kalika Devasthan Kasarpal

Gallery

External links

Temples of Goa
Shri Shantadurga Temple, Kavalem
Shree Shantadurga Devi , Kavlem , Phonda, Goa Official Website
Photo of Shanta Durga Temple
Other Durga-Shantadurga Temples
Navadurga Temples

Shakti temples
20th-century Hindu temples
Hindu temples in North Goa district
20th-century architecture in India